Septesinus is a genus of monopisthocotylean monogeneans which currently comprises a single species, Septesinus gibsoni

References

External links
 South Australian Museum: Catch of the day in Borneo uncovers new species

Monopisthocotylea
Monogenea genera